"Fly on the Wall" is a song by American singer Miley Cyrus. It was released on November 4, 2008, as the third single from her second studio album, Breakout, in Australia, and second everywhere else. It was the final single released from the album. The song's lyrics have been interpreted in a number of ways, such as a description of an abusive boyfriend. In actuality, Cyrus says the song describes paparazzi and their extensive personal privacy invasions.

The song received acclaim from music critics, with many claiming it defied teen pop expectations and was Breakouts best track. "Fly on the Wall" reached its highest international peak on the UK Singles Chart, at number 16. The single's music video was directed by Philip Andelman and premiered on FNMTV. The "Thriller" inspired video takes place mainly in a parking garage in which Cyrus encounters and attempts to escape the paparazzi. Cyrus promoted the song through several venues, including a performance on her second headlining tour, the Wonder World Tour, that incorporated a short segment of the "Thriller" dance. Cyrus also performed the song on her Gypsy Heart Tour.

Background
The song's lyrics, written by Cyrus, Antonina Armato, Tim James and Devrim Karaoglu, have been mistakenly interpreted in a variety of ways. The song's protagonist sings in first person perspective while condemning an unspecified subject for wanting to invade her privacy. The majority of reviewers thought the protagonist was referring to a "controlling boyfriend". Ben Ratliff of The New York Times sided with the boyfriend, and believed the song's protagonist was "bullying some poor boy for the sin of wanting to know what she talks about with her friends". Sarah Rodman of The Boston Globe believed the song could have described a number of subjects, such as "a former boyfriend, the media, and even her fans". However, in an interview with Jocelyn Vena of MTV News, Cyrus said the song was about "the media" and "how they think they know everything about [her], when they don't. They want to be a fly on [her] wall and watch [her] 24/7." Cyrus elaborated on the concept in an interview with Nancy O'Dell of Access Hollywood. She stated,

Composition

"Fly on the Wall" is a song with strong uses of electric guitars, keyboards and soprano vocals. Influences derive from electronic music and industrial music. It is set in common time with a moderately fast rock tempo of 143 beats per minute. The song is written in the key of G minor. Cyrus' vocal range spans two octaves from the low note of G3 to the high note of D5. The song has the following chord progression, G5—D—Gm7. The song's chorus has the use of a vocal hook; the hook sings, "fly on the wall".

Critical reception
"Fly on the Wall" received critical acclaim. Heather Phares of AllMusic said the song was a "G-rated version" of Britney Spears' song "Toxic" and provided hints of Cyrus' future musical direction. Sarah Rodman of The Boston Globe said "Fly on the Wall" was a change of pace for Cyrus and called it "the album's most interesting tune". Mikael Wood of the Los Angeles Times said the song is a result of regular Walt Disney Company standards, yet "the CD's best cut". Along with "Full Circle", Sal Cinquemani of Slant Magazine said the song was a "more worthy" follow-up to "See You Again". Mordechai Shinefield of The Village Voice stated the song was "blazingly brilliant" and that it was "the best, angriest song [on Breakout]". Johnny Dee of Virgin Media said the song and "7 Things" were "feisty pop belters" that would encourage a long-term career. Ratliff negatively compared "Fly on the Wall" to the Pussycat Dolls and said that although Cyrus' voice is generally rich with a deep range, it became "pinched and stingy" in the single. However, he also said the song was "teen-accurate".

Chart performance

For the week ending August 9, 2008, "Fly on the Wall" charted at number 69 on Digital Songs due to the release of Breakout, but failed to reach the Billboard Hot 100; the following week, the song completely fell from the sales chart. For the week ending January 10, 2009, the song debuted and peaked at number 84 in the Hot 100 due to airplay, leaving the chart after two weeks. The song also reached number 64 on the now-discontinued Pop 100 chart. In the Canadian Hot 100, the peaked and debuted at number 73 on the week ending August 9, 2008, due to digital downloads. It then ascended and descended the Canadian Hot 100 before reaching its last week, ending on February 7, 2009.

The song was more successful in European nations. For the week ending January 31, 2009, "Fly on the Wall" debuted on the UK Singles Chart at number 90. Throughout February, the song moved up, finding new peaks for three consecutive weeks. For the week ending February 28, the song ascended to number 16 and became Cyrus' second best charting single in the United Kingdom at the time. It then slid several spots down, until its last week on the singles chart at number 86, for the week ending April 4. In the European Hot 100, "Fly on the Wall" peaked at number fifty-seven on the week ending March 7, 2009 and spent a total of five weeks on the chart. The song spent two weeks and peaked at number 23 on the Irish Singles Chart. In Austria, the song debuted and peaked on the week ending March 18 at number 57 and fell from the chart after two weeks. It spent seven weeks in Germany, where it debuted and peaked at 62.

Music video

In an interview with MTV News, director Philip Andelman explained that Cyrus was already determined to poke fun at the paparazzi when she contacted him for a "Fly on the Wall" music video. Andelman did not want to create "something too serious" and worked to give the video a "playful" aspect. Cyrus elaborated on the concept of the music video in an interview with Nancy O'Dell of Access Hollywood. Cyrus said, 

The video commences with a short segment of dramatic music. It then focuses on Cyrus, wearing a white tank top, jeans, boots and a black leather jacket, and her boyfriend leaving a movie theater and discussing the movie they saw. Suddenly, Cyrus' boyfriend begins to cough as a full moon emerges from behind the clouds. Cyrus is confused, then horrified as she watches him transform into a paparazzi, and runs away from him as he shouts "Miley, come here! I just want a couple of shots!" and tries to snap pictures of her. The music of "Fly on the Wall" begins as Cyrus runs into a parking garage and tries to hide behind a pillar and a black Mercedes-Benz SLR McLaren. As soon as Cyrus tries to move away from the car, a mob of paparazzi begins to chase her with their cameras. Throughout much of the video, Cyrus runs and hides from the mob. Clips interspaced throughout the video feature her in a long silver shirt and jeans singing and dancing in front of the Mercedes. Eventually, Cyrus is cornered by the paparazzi. She is scared, but then surprised and perplexed when the mob unexpectedly begins to dance in a synchronized manner. Her boyfriend, appearing normal, then arrives in the Mercedes to rescue her. Inside the car, Cyrus describes her strange encounter with the paparazzi to him. Unknown to Cyrus, her boyfriend has planted a video camera in the car; the music video concludes with a shot of the website he posts the video on beneath the headline, "Miley Cyrus Bugs at Paparazzi!!!" The music video to "Fly on the Wall" was first seen on December 5, 2008, on MTV's FNMTV. The video is inspired by Michael Jackson's iconic music video, "Thriller", but trades zombies for paparazzi. MTV also compared the "Fly on the Wall" video for those for "Circus" by Britney Spears and "Rumors" by Lindsay Lohan.

Live performances

Cyrus first performed the song at the opening ceremony of the 2008 Disney Channel Games on May 4, 2008. The performance had Cyrus in a red coat and was later used a promotional music video on Disney Channel. On May 17, 2008, she performed the song at the 2008 Zootopia. On July 18, 2008, the song was performed in a concert series for Good Morning America along with "Breakout", "7 Things" and "Bottom of the Ocean". During the performance, Cyrus wore a plaid shirt, mini-shorts and boots. On August 1, 2008, Cyrus performed "Fly on the Wall" on FNMTV. On November 21, it was sung at the American Music Awards of 2008. A critic from ABC stated that Cyrus "fearlessly embraced new creative directions" with her performance of "Fly on the Wall". On November 25, Cyrus performed the song on the season finale of Dancing with the Stars. On New Year's Eve of 2008, Cyrus wore a white T-shirt, pants, boots and a plaid jacket to present FNMTVs New Year's Special with Pete Wentz. She opened the episode by performing the song, paired with "7 Things". On January 19, 2009, the song was performed at the Kids' Inaugural: "We Are the Future" event in celebration of Barack Obama's inauguration. For the event, she had an abundance of background dancers, and Cyrus wore a casual patterned gray T-shirt, black pants, and boots. On February 14, 2009, Cyrus performed the song live on the British television variety show Ant & Dec's Saturday Night Takeaway where she momentarily forgot the lyrics, reportedly mouthing "I forgot the words!" to one of her backup dancers, and prompting media coverage over the blunder. She also performed the song in London in an Apple Store. The set, with some songs by Cyrus' father, was sold exclusively by the United Kingdom iTunes Store as an extended play titled iTunes Live from London. On June 7, 2009, at the twentieth annual A Time for Heroes Celebrity Carnival, Cyrus performed "Fly on the Wall".

"Fly on the Wall" was one of the songs on the setlist of Cyrus' first international concert tour, the Wonder World Tour (2009). The performance began with two overhead screens displaying a frog catching a fly while two acrobats scaled imaginary walls. Cyrus and her dancers then emerged from a green tractor to begin the song. She wore an extravagant white dress with a feathered back and used elaborate choreography. At one point during the performance, Cyrus unexpectedly flew over the crowd for a few seconds. At the conclusion, Cyrus and her background dancers grouped together to perform a segment of the dance from Michael Jackson's "Thriller" music video. She performed it at the Rock in Rio concert in Lisbon, Portugal on May 29, 2010 and Madrid, Spain on June 4, 2010.

Cyrus last performed the song during her Gypsy Heart Tour (2011) and more recently during the Latin American part of her Attention Tour (2022).

Track listing and formats
CD
"Fly on the Wall" – 2:31
"7 Things" (Bimbo Jones radio edit) – 2:58
"Fly on the Wall" (Jason Nevins remix; radio edit) – 2:52

Digital download (2 track single)
"Fly on the Wall" – 2:31
"Fly on the Wall" (Jason Nevins remix; radio edit) – 2:52

Digital download (Digital Dog remix)
"Fly on the Wall" – 2:31
"Fly on the Wall" (Digital Dog remix) – 5:40

Digital download (extended play)
"Fly on the Wall" – 2:31
"Fly on the Wall" (Jason Nevins remix; radio edit) – 2:52
"7 Things" (Bimbo Jones radio edit) – 2:58

Charts

Release history

References

2008 songs
2008 singles
Miley Cyrus songs
Songs written by Antonina Armato
Songs written by Tim James (musician)
Hollywood Records singles
Songs written by Miley Cyrus
Songs about the media
Songs written by Devrim Karaoglu
Music videos directed by Philip Andelman